The Sword of Moses is the title of an apocryphal Jewish book of magic edited by Moses Gaster in Israel, in 1896 from a 13th- or 14th-century manuscript from his own collection, formerly MS Gaster 78, now London, British Library MS Or. 10678. Gaster assumed that the text predates the 11th century, based on a letter by Rav Hai Gaon (939-1038) which mentions the book alongside the Sefer ha-Yashar, described as another book of formulas, and that it may even date to as early as the first four centuries CE. 

Besides the medieval manuscript used by Gaster, a short fragment of the text survives in Cod. Oxford 1531. A new critical edition was printed in 1997 by the Israeli scholar Yuval Harari based on a variant text found in another manuscript. An English translation of the same was published in 2012.

Contents 

The largest manuscript of the Sword of Moses begins with a description of the heavenly realms and angels, and soon moves onto describing various prayers, invocations, and ritual procedures that the reader is to perform before he is able to use the "Sword"; this term refers to a huge list of magical names later in the text, divided into 136 sections, each with a different magical use. The list of names is given first, followed by its uses in the next section:

[1]If at a full moon you wish to seize and to bind a man and a woman so that they will be with each other, and to annul spirits and blast-demons and satans, and to bind a boat, and to free a man from prison, and for every thing, write on a red plate from TWBR TSBR until H’ BŠMHT.[2] And if you wish to destroy high mountains and to pass (in safety) through the sea and the land, and to go down into fire and come up, and to remove kings, and to cause an optical illusion, and to stop up a mouth, and to converse with the dead, and to kill the living, and to bring down and raise up and adjure angels to abide by you, and to learn all the secrets of the world, write on a silver plate, and put in it a root of artemisia, from TWBR TSBR until H’BŠMHT. [3]For a spirit that moves in the body, write on magzab from
TWBR until MNGYNWN. [4]For a spirit that causes inflammation, write from MGNYNWN until HYDRSṬ'.

Here is a brief abstract  of the original Sword of Moses by Gaster:
The Sword of Moses. In the name of the mighty and holy God! Four angels are appointed to the “Sword” given by the Lord, the Master of mysteries, and they are appointed to the Law, and they see with penetration the mysteries from above and below; and these are their names — SKD HUZI, MRGIOIAL, VHDRZIOLO, TOTRISI. [CQD HUZI MRGIZIAL, UHDRZIULU, TUTRISI] And over these are five others, holy and mighty, who meditate on the mysteries of God in the world for seven hours every day, and they are appointed to thousands of thousands, and to myriads of thousands of Chariots, ready to do the will of their Creator.

Here is a brief abstract of the book The Sword of Moses :

In the name of mighty and holy God!
Four angels are appointed to the Sword given by the Lord, the Master of mysteries, and they are appointed the Law, and they see with penetration the mysteries from above and below; and these are their names-SHAQADHUZIAY, MARGIYOIEL, ASHARUYLIAY, TOTRUSIYAY. Pronounced Shaqad Hozi, Marji-wial, Hade-ru-i-zelu, Tu-ter-i-si 
And over these are five others,
holy and mighty, who meditate on the mysteries of God in the world for seven hours every day, and they are appointed to thousands of thousands, and to myriads of thousands of Chariots, ready to do the will of their Creator.
If you look at the transliteration of the Sacred names of the 4 angels appointed to the Sword. You will see I have decoded them.
SKD HUZI= SHAQADHUZIAY
MRGIOIAL= MARGIYOIEL
VHDRZIOLO= ASHARUYLIAY
 TOTRISI= TOTRUSIYAY
 [CQD HUZI MRGIZIAL, UHDRZIULU, TUTRISI]

Editions 
 M. Gaster, London (1896) (online copy, Hebrew version of the same)
 Yuval Harari, אקדמון Israel (1997) חרבא דמשה: מהדורה חדשה ומחקר
 Yuval Harari, University of Pennsylvania Press (2012) (English)
 Geoffrey Harris, Author Of The Sword Of Moses With All The Divine Names, you can find it here, ( (English)

The Sword of Moses in fiction
The original manuscripts of The Sword of Moses kept in London and Oxford feature centrally in Dominic Selwood's 2013 crypto-thriller The Sword of Moses (Corax, London, 2013) .

See also 
 Old Testament Pseudepigrapha
 Assumption of Moses

References 

Texts attributed to Moses
Kabbalah texts
Jewish grimoires